Bruce Frederick Billson (born 26 January 1966) is a former politician who was a Liberal member of the Australian House of Representatives representing the Division of Dunkley in Victoria from 1996 to 2016. Billson served as the Minister for Small Business from September 2013 to September 2015.

Early life and education
Billson was born in Albury, New South Wales, and moved to Seaford, Victoria as a child. He was educated at Monterey High School in Frankston North and the Royal Melbourne Institute of Technology. He was Manager of Corporate Development for the Shire of Hastings, a ministerial adviser to the Victorian Minister for Natural Resources, and policy adviser to the Shadow Minister for the Environment, Senator Rod Kemp, before entering politics.

Career

Ministerial roles

Billson was appointed the Parliamentary Secretary to the Minister for Foreign Affairs in 2004. In 2005, he was also appointed Parliamentary Secretary to the Minister for Immigration and Multicultural and Indigenous Affairs, and, in 2006, he was promoted to Minister for Veterans' Affairs – a position he retained until the defeat of the Howard government in the 2007 federal election.

In 2007, he was appointed Shadow Minister for Broadband, Communications and the Digital Economy. In 2009, he was then appointed the Shadow Minister for Sustainable Development and Cities. and after the 2010 election he was appointed Shadow Minister for Small Business, Competition Policy and Consumer Affairs.

Following the 2013 election he was sworn into the cabinet as the Minister for Small Business.

Retirement from politics
Following the leadership spill that saw Malcolm Turnbull become Prime Minister, Billson was dropped from the new Ministry upon the ascension of the Turnbull Government. On 24 November 2015, he announced he would retire from politics at the 2016 federal election.  On 22 March 2016, it was announced that he would serve as the executive chairman of the Franchise Council of Australia (FCA). 

In August 2017, Billson admitted he had received a salary from the FCA several months before his retirement, which he had not declared on the register of members' interests. Billson apologised to the Clerk of the House for the omission, but claimed his directorship was not concealed and there was no conflict of interest.

Although cleared of breaching ministerial guidelines, an inquiry conducted by the House of Representatives' Standing Committee of Privileges and Members' Interests recommended in March 2018 that Billson be censured for failing to disclose receiving a salary for the FCA, and for undertaking work for the organisation through his consultancy business before leaving parliament.  The Committee's report stated that Billson's "decision to accept the role with FCA while he was a member falls below the standards expected of a member of the house". On 27 March the House of Representatives passed a motion censuring Billson.

Beginning 11 March 2021 he took up a government role as the Australian Small Business and Family Enterprise Ombudsman, replacing Kate Carnell. The news site Crikey noted that the role of Small Business Ombudsman had been initially created by Billson while he was the Minister for Small Business.

Board Roles
Executive Chair – Franchise Council of Australia

Independent Non Executive Director – Judo Capital

Personal life
He is married to Kate and has four children: Alexander, Zoe, Madeline and Isabella.

References

External links
 
 

|-

1966 births
Abbott Government
Government ministers of Australia
Liberal Party of Australia members of the Parliament of Australia
Living people
Members of the Australian House of Representatives
Members of the Australian House of Representatives for Dunkley
Members of the Cabinet of Australia
People from Albury, New South Wales
RMIT University alumni
21st-century Australian politicians
20th-century Australian politicians
People from the City of Frankston